Susan K. Blessing (born April 10, 1961) is an American physicist who is currently a professor at Florida State University and an elected fellow of the American Physical Society.

Early life and education
Blessing was born on April 10, 1961. She earned her B.S. at Illinois Institute of Technology in 1982 and her Ph.D at Indiana University in 1989.  After earning her Ph.D., she was a research associate at Northwestern University from 1989-1993.

Career
Blessing joined Florida State University in 1994 as an Assistant Professor in physics rising to Professor by 2007.  She has served as Director of the Women in Math, Science, and Engineering (WIMSE) program since 2005.  From 2010-12, she held the Nancy Marcus Professorship.

Research
Her academic interest is in particle physics. Her highest cited paper is "Transverse energy distributions within jets in collisions at TeV" at 100 times, according to Google Scholar.

Awards
George B. Pegram Award from the Southeastern Section of the American Physical Society (2017)
Fellow of the American Physical Society (2017)

Publications

References

External links

1961 births
Florida State University faculty
American physicists
Fellows of the American Physical Society
Living people
American women physicists
American women academics
21st-century American women